Ejnar Hertzsprung (Copenhagen, 8 October 1873 – 21 October 1967, Roskilde) was a Danish chemist and astronomer.

Career
Hertzsprung was born in Frederiksberg, Denmark, the son of Severin and Henriette. He studied chemical engineering at Copenhagen Polytechnic Institute, graduating in 1898. After spending two years working as a chemist in St. Petersburg, in 1901 he studied photochemistry at Leipzig University for a year. His father was an amateur astronomer, which led to Ejnar's interest in the subject. He began making astronomical observations in Fredericksberg in 1902, and within a few years had noticed that stars with similar spectral type could have widely different absolute magnitudes. In 1909, he took a position at the Göttingen Observatory under director Karl Schwarzschild.

In 1911 Hertzsprung developed the Hertzsprung–Russell diagram, independently developed in 1913 by Henry Norris Russell.

In 1913 Hertzsprung determined the distances to several Cepheid variable stars by parallax, and was thus able to calibrate the relationship, discovered by Henrietta Leavitt, between Cepheid period and luminosity. In this determination he made a mistake, possibly a slip of the pen, putting the stars 10 times too close. He used this relationship to estimate the distance to the Small Magellanic Cloud. From 1919 to 1946, Hertzsprung worked at Leiden Observatory in the Netherlands, from 1937 as director. Among his graduate students at Leiden was Gerard Kuiper.

Perhaps his greatest contribution to astronomy was the development of a classification system for stars to divide them by spectral type, stage in their development, and luminosity. He used the earlier classification system developed by Antonia Maury in his work. The so-called "Hertzsprung–Russell Diagram" has been used ever since as a classification system to explain stellar types and stellar evolution. He also discovered two asteroids, one of which is 1627 Ivar, an Amor asteroid.

His wife Henrietta (1881–1956) was a daughter of the Dutch astronomer Jacobus Kapteyn. Hertzsprung died in Roskilde in 1967. The asteroid 1693 Hertzsprung was named in his honour.

Asteroids discovered 
 1627 Ivar (25 September 1929)
 1702 Kalahari (7 July 1924)

Honors 

 Awards
 Gold Medal of the Royal Astronomical Society in 1929
 Bruce Medal in 1937

 Named after him
 lunar impact crater Hertzsprung
 main-belt asteroid 1693 Hertzsprung

Sources 
 Sky & Telescope, January, 1968, Sky Publishing Corporation, Cambridge

References

External links 

 Bruce Medal page
 Awarding of Bruce Medal: PASP 49 (1937) 65
 Awarding of RAS gold medal: MNRAS 89 (1929) 404

1873 births
1967 deaths
20th-century Danish astronomers
People from Copenhagen
Danish chemists
Discoverers of asteroids
Recipients of the Gold Medal of the Royal Astronomical Society